Akbarian is an Iranian surname. Notable people with the surname include:

 Aziz Akbarian (born 1957), Iranian politician
 Hashem Akbarian (1897–1971), Iranian wrestler

Other
 Akbariyya, Akbarian school in Sufism, based on the teachings of Ibn 'Arabi

Iranian-language surnames